On 27 May 1975, a coach carrying elderly passengers crashed at the bottom of a steep hill at Dibble's Bridge, near Hebden in North Yorkshire, England. Thirty-three people on board were killed, including the driver, and thirteen others injured. It was the worst-ever road accident in the United Kingdom by number of fatalities.

Accident
The coach, a 1967 Bedford VAM5 run by Riley's Luxury Coaches, was carrying 45 female pensioners on a day trip from Thornaby-on-Tees, North Yorkshire, to Grassington, in the Yorkshire Dales. The trip was organised by Dorothy White, Lady Mayoress of Thornaby who had previously run several such trips. While driving on a downhill stretch of the B6265 road between Greenhow and Hebden, stand-in coach driver Roger Marriott, a British Steel Corporation security officer, missed a gear. He then applied the brakes. The brakes had been serviced a week before the crash and had new linings, but as magistrates were later told, "defects" due to improper maintenance "meant there was no braking on the offside rear wheel".

The aluminium sides of the coach then buckled on impact with the ground.

The son-in-law of the cottage owners, London barrister (now painter and sculptor) Lincoln Seligman, was having a barbecue with his partner in the garden at the time and was first on the scene. He later gave an eyewitness account to the Teesside Evening Gazette: "There were screams. I dragged some people out ... I don't know how many".

Steven Griffin, Steve Jennison and Carl Dickinson, teenagers from Hull who were camping nearby, heard the crash and came to assist. One saw the bus flip over and saw the entire upper section crushed when it landed. They said the scene was silent when they arrived two minutes later, with the survivors stunned into silence. A car was flagged down and eventually one ambulance with a single driver arrived. He radioed a code which eventually brought a fleet of ambulances to ferry the injured to Airedale General Hospital in Keighley.

The initial aftermath was 32 killed on the scene and 14 seriously injured all with major head and neck trauma. No-one was uninjured. One of the injured later died.

Inquest
An inquest at Skipton Town Hall, in July 1975, recorded a verdict of accidental death on the victims. Jury foreman John Mitchell said the accident was caused by the inability of the driver to negotiate the bend, owing to deficient brakes on the coach, due to possible lack of care in the maintenance of the braking system. The pathologist reported that the main cause of the loss of life was the crushing of the victims between the seats. The proprietor of the coach company, Norman Riley, was later fined £75 for running a motor vehicle with defective brakes.

Aftermath
Even before the crash there had been a campaign to have electro-magnetic retarders fitted to all coaches. An electro-magnetic retarder uses the rotation of the axle to generate electricity, the energy for which has to come from the movement of the axle. The use of such a retarder means that the frictional brakes are kept cool for use at slow speeds. Local newspaper The Yorkshire Post staged a trial two weeks later: a coach which had been fitted with the retarder was put out of gear and allowed to run away down the hill without braking, and the retarder kept the coach's speed within safe limits. The Dibble's Bridge crash brought the issue to a wider public; ultimately, legislation was passed requiring improved braking systems.

A memorial service was held at St Paul's Church, Thornaby, in May 2015 to mark the fortieth anniversary of the crash, when a memorial plaque was unveiled outside Thornaby Town Hall listing the names of those who died.

Deaths

Roger Marriott (driver), Betty Aitchison, Margaret Baldwin, Lillian Barclay, Rosaline Brown, Jenny Butler, Gladys Callaghan, Isobel Chisholm, Ada Christon, Gwendoline Dodsworth, Ida Fisher, Hannah Forth, Hilda Gibbon, Irene Groskop, Grace Harrison, Edna Herron, Elizabeth Hill, Doris Howsden, Henrietta Kirk, Jenny Lowe, Kathleen Maud, Margaret Mennell, Elsie Middleton, Henrietta Pedley, Eva Pratt, Harriet Riley, Eileen Ross, Jean Smart, Eva Thomas, Dorothy White (mayoress), Freda Wilkinson, Edith Woodhouse, and Sylvia Worn.

Injuries

Alice Benson, Mary Booth, Edna Clementson, Edna Dobson, Joan Hymer, Joan Marriott, Lillian McLeod, Doreen Parkinson, Helena Pickering, Madeleine Pratt, May Richardson, Margaret Robinson, and Eva Rogers.

References

1975 disasters in the United Kingdom
1975 in England
1975 road incidents
1970s in North Yorkshire
Bus incidents in England
May 1975 events in the United Kingdom
Transport disasters in Yorkshire